All That I Love is a 2009 Polish film directed by Jacek Borcuch. The film has been selected for competition in the Word Cinema Dramatic Competition at the Sundance Film Festival 2010. It was also selected as the Polish entry for the Best Foreign Language Film at the 83rd Academy Awards but it didn't make the final shortlist.

Plot
All That I Love is a film about a young musician, Janek, in a coastal city of Poland during the early period of the Solidarity strikes, martial law in Poland, manifestations, and general political turmoil. Janek's father is an official of the local military police, and while he utilizes that connection to secure rehearsal space for his punk band (in the officer's hall of the police barracks), he rebels against the official repression of lyrical freedom and political activism. His love interest, Basia, is the daughter of an active Solidarity member, who initially forbids Basia from seeing Janek due to his governmental connections.
They continue to see each other secretly, and their romance inspires Janek to send demos to a prestigious Polish summer music festival. He is selected to play, but his attempt to get his politically sensitive lyrics past the state censor ends badly, and he is forbidden from playing. However, at the end-of-year concert, at which the censor turns up personally to attempt to prevent Janek from singing Solidarity-friendly songs to his classmates, turns into a youth celebration of Solidarity.

Cast
 Mateusz Kościukiewicz – Janek
 Olga Frycz – Basia Martyniak
 Jakub Gierszał – Kazik
 Andrzej Chyra – Janek's father
 Anna Radwan – Ela – Janek's mother
 Katarzyna Herman – Sokołowska
 Mateusz Banasiuk – Staszek
 Marek Kalita – Cpt. Sokołowski
 Igor Obłoza – 'Evil'
 Zygmunt Malanowicz – Janek's grandfather
 Elżbieta Karkoszka – Janek's grandmother

See also
 List of submissions to the 83rd Academy Awards for Best Foreign Language Film
 List of Polish submissions for the Academy Award for Best Foreign Language Film

References

External links 

 Official Homepage of All That I Love
 All that I love - review

2009 films
2000s Polish-language films
2009 drama films
Polish drama films